Mohada is a village in Yavatmal district of Maharashtra State in India.

It is a famous marketplace in Yavatmal District. It is near the Saikheda Dam, an earthfill dam on the Khuni River.

Demographics
The Mohada Village located in Kelapur Taluka, 5544 People are living in this Village, 2836 are males and 2708 are females as per 2011 census. Expected Mohada population 2021/2022 is between 5,433 and 6,209. Literate people are 3921 out of 2137 are male and 1784 are female. People living in Mohada depend on multiple skills, total workers are 2880 out of which men are 1661 and women are 1219. Total 371 Cultivators are depended on agriculture farming out of 316 are cultivated by men and 55 are women. 1632 people works in agricultural land as a labour in Mohada, men are 931 and 701 are women.

(Caste Factor)
Schedule Tribe (ST) constitutes 24.37 % while Schedule Caste (SC) were 7.32 % of total population in Mohada village.

References

Villages in Yavatmal district